Captain Wronski is a 1954 West German spy film directed by Ulrich Erfurth and starring Willy Birgel, Elisabeth Flickenschildt, and Antje Weisgerber. A Polish officer works undercover in 1930s Berlin to discover Nazi Germany's plans against his homeland.

The film is very loosely based on 's book about Jerzy Sosnowski. It was shot at the Tempelhof Studios in Berlin with sets designed by the art director Fritz Maurischat. The casting of Birgel in the title role referenced his best-known performance during the Nazi era when he had played another Rittmeister in Riding for Germany (1941).

Cast

References

Bibliography

External links 
 

1954 films
1950s spy drama films
German spy drama films
West German films
1950s German-language films
Films directed by Ulrich Erfurth
Films set in the 1930s
Films set in Berlin
Films set in Poland
Films about Nazi Germany
Films based on non-fiction books
Films shot at Tempelhof Studios
1954 drama films
German black-and-white films
1950s German films